Eireks Saga Víðförla is a legendary saga about a Norwegian, Eric the Traveller.  He travels to Miklagard, modern Istanbul, with Eric the Dane.  There he interacts with a King, possibly the Eastern Roman Emperor, who informs him on Christianity and Údáinsakr.  After a period of study he then journeys to India and beyond in search of Údáinsakr (the Deathless Acre), and returns. Modern analysis have concluded that the place mentioned is likely in modern Yemen at Aden.  This version of the epic was transcribed almost 400 years after the facts reported.  This telling merges the Údáinsakr of Norse mythology with the notion of heaven in Christianity to create a theological bridge between the belief systems.  This however was a later addition to the written version, which has been compromised by later bias.  Due to this fact, the composition is now regarded as largely mythical, despite being taught as Icelandic history for centuries.  The lone source on the Life of Eric the Traveller is the Icelandic manuscript Skálholtsbók.

External links
The saga in Old Norse at «heimskringla.no»

The saga in English translation by Tunstall with Facing Old Norse Text

Legendary sagas
Istanbul in fiction